Saurashtra, also known as United State of Kathiawar, was a State of India that existed between 1948 and 1956, on Saurashtra alias Kathiawar peninsula, with Rajkot as its capital,

History

Formation as United State of Kathiawar 
Saurashtra State was originally named the United State of Kathiawar. It was formed on 15 February 1948, from approximately 200 large and small Princely States of the colonial Baroda, Western India and Gujarat States Agency of the British raj territory under direct colonial rule.

The name of State was given after the Kathiawar and Saurashtra region, both of which generally denote the same geographical region of lands on the main peninsula of Gujarat.
The persuasions of Sardar Vallabhbhai Patel and the influence of Mahatma Gandhi are credited for persuading most of the States of Kathiawar to join the Union of India and sign the Instrument of Accession. Patel met and managed to convince the local princes and petty subas, totaling 222 in Saurashtra region alone.
Among these in Kathiawar Agency were 14 Salute states, 17 minor and 191 petty Non-salute Princely States and 46 Estates (Jagir-level). Most of the native rulers of the Kathiawar States entered into a Covenant for the formation of the United States of Kathiawar on 24 January 1948.

The large Kathiawar peninsula included some prominent princely states of India, notably salute state : 
 the vast Baroda State, title Maharaja Gaekwar, Hereditary salute of 21-guns (highest native rank in colonial India)
 Idar, title Maharaja, Hereditary salute of 15-guns
 Bhavnagar State, title Maharaja, Hereditary salute of 13-guns (15-guns local)
 Navanagar, title Maharaja Jam Sahib, Hereditary salute of 13-guns (15-guns local)
 Dhrangadhra(-Halvad), title Maharaja Raj Sahib, Hereditary salute of 13-guns
 Porbandar, title Maharaja Rana Sahib, Hereditary salute of 13-guns
 Rajpipla State, title Rajpipla, Hereditary salute of 13-guns
 Cambay, title Nawab, Hereditary salute of 11-guns
 Gondal, title Maharaja, Hereditary salute of 11-guns
 Morvi, title Maharan, Hereditary salute of 11-guns 
 Wankaner, title Maharana Raj Sahib, Hereditary salute of 11-guns
 Baria, title Maharaol, Hereditary salute of 9-guns (11-guns personal)
 Dharampur, title Raja, Hereditary salute of 9-guns (11-guns personal)
 Dhrol, title Thakore Sahib, Hereditary salute of 9-guns
 Limbdi, title Thakore Sahib, Hereditary salute of 9-guns
 Palitana, title Thakore Sahib, Hereditary salute of 9-guns
 Rajkot, title Thakore Sahib, Hereditary salute of 9-guns
 Sachin, title Nawab, Hereditary salute of 9-guns
 Wadhwan, title Maharana, Hereditary salute of 9-guns

and many smaller non-salute-states, including petty (e)states, often not more than one or two villages, making the peninsula the most fragmented of feudal age India.

Among the States of Kathiawar, Baroda State -which was the third largest Princely state of India, having its territories scattered over Dwarka in West of Kathiawar to Bombay in South- did not sign the covenant for the formation of the United States of Kathiawar. Instead the erstwhile Gaekwar Maharaja of Baroda, Pratap Singh Gaekwad declared a full responsible Government on 4 September 1948, under Jivraj Narayan Mehta, as Prime Minister of the State, as per scheme envisioned by Sardar Patel. The Baroda State later merged itself into Bombay State on 1 May 1949.

Sardar Vallabhbhai Patel inaugurated the United State of Kathiawar on 15 February 1948. On this occasion he paid tribute to Jam Sahib and the other rulers of erstwhile Princely States of Kathiawar, saying :- 

The Jam Sahib K. S. Digvijaysinhji of Nawanagar State one of the chief negotiator from the side of rulers of Kathiawar in his reply observed and said :-

Jawaharlal Nehru described the event as a great step forward and one of the most notable in contemporary Indian history. He further commended the statesmanship of Sardar Patel and further wrote in his letter to provincial chief ministers on 20 February 1948 :-

Upon formation of United State of Kathiawar, Lord Mountbatten also congratulated Sardar Patel, saying :-

However, it was sad that Mahatma Gandhi was not alive by that time to see his dream of whole of Kathiawar getting united under one umbrella.

Even after creation of United States of Kathiawar, there were some patches of lands in Kathiawar belonging to princely states of Junagadh, Mangrol, Manavadar and others, which did not join the convention and were wishing to join Pakistan. It was later after violent integration of Junagadh into Union of India that a referendum was held and Junagadh, Mangrol, Manavadar, Babariawad and others became a legal part of India. However, due to some technicalities, these territories even after the referendum remained under an Executive Council of popular representatives of Junagadh led by Samaldas Gandhi, for some time, who assisted the administrator appointed by Government of India in managing affairs of these states.

Renamed Saurashtra 
In November 1948, the United State of Kathiawar was renamed the United State of Saurashtra or Saurashtra State, when a supplementary covenant was negotiated and executed by the native rulers of the princely states merged into United State of Kathiawar.
 
Once the Saurashtra Union came into existence, a second supplementary covenant was executed in January 1949, providing the integration of Junagadh with Saurashtra. A few days later on 20 February 1949, the administration of Junagadh State (another major salute state) and also that of Mangrol, Manavadar, Babariawad, Bantva and Sardargarh were officially  handed over to Saurashtra Government.

Dissolution 
On 1 November 1956 Saurashtra State ceased to exist as a State and became a part of Bombay State, the territory of which was enlarged on that day to include Kutch State, Saurashtra State, Marathwada & Vidarbha, while a southern portion was excluded, which went to Karnataka.

Following Mahagujarat Movement, the Bombay State was again dissolved  to be carved into two separate states of Maharashtra and Gujarat created on linguistic basis on 1 May 1960 With this, the area of Saurashtra State again became a geographically defined region, Saurashtra, within the State of Gujarat.

Chief officers

Rajpramukhs 
The following princes of salute states served as Rajpramukh (premier Prince), i.e. Head of the State :
 Krishnakumarsinhji Bhavsinhji (b. 1912 - d. 1965), the last ruler of Bhavnagar State, was acting Rajpramukh.
 Digvijaysinhji Ranjitsinhji, last ruler of Nawanagar, was Rajpramukh from 1948 until 31 October 1956
 Mayurdwajsinhji Meghrajji III, the last ruler of Dhrangadhra State, was appointed as Upa-Rajpramukh alias Deputy Rajapramukh, to serve as acting Rajpramukh during the absence of Rajpramukh. He worked as Uprajpramukh from 1948 till 1956.

Chief Ministers 

 Uchharangray Navalshankar Dhebar acted as Chief Minister of State from 1948 till December 1954 (b. 1905 - d. 1977)  INC .
 Rasiklal Umedchand Parikh was second and last Chief Minister of State from 19 December 1954 till 1956 (b. 1910 - d. 1982)  INC .

See also 
 1952 Saurashtra Legislative Assembly election
 Baroda, Western India and Gujarat States Agency
 Political integration of India

References

Sources and external links 
 WorldStatesmen - India - States post 1947

 
Former states and territories of India
History of Gujarat (1947–present)
Political integration of India
Vallabhbhai Patel
1956 disestablishments in India
States and territories established in 1948
1948 establishments in India
States and territories disestablished in 1956